Pierre Labatut, also known as Pedro Labatut (1776 – 1849) was a French general who fought in the Brazilian War of Independence.

Biography 
Labatut served in  Europe during the Peninsular War. Then he came to South America and fought in Colombia against the royalists in Santa Marta, alongside Simón Bolívar. He also traveled to the West Indies and then to French Guiana.

Labatut came to Brazil, where in Rio de Janeiro he was hired and accepted the service offered by the Prince Regent Pedro on July 3, 1822. He was given the rank of brigadier general, because of the shortage of officers in the newly organized army.

He organized the Army called Peacemaker, (name probably suggested by the Minister of Foreign Affairs and José Bonifácio de Andrada). He traveled with his troops to Bahia, the squadron was commanded by Division Chief Rodrigo de Lamare, consisting of a frigate, two corvettes and two brigs, with the mission to face the Portuguese general Inácio Luís Madeira de Melo. He entrenched his forces in defiance of the Regent. He defeated the Portuguese in the Battle of Pirajá.

He fought in the Ragamuffin War against David Canabarro. His battalion arrived in Passo Fundo, but was wiped out in September 1840.
 
Pierre Labatut received the title of Marechal-de-campo. He left active service in 1842 and died in the ancient streets of Salvador Barris. The town renamed the street Labatut General.

References

External links 
Biography

1776 births
1849 deaths
French soldiers
Brazilian generals
History of Bahia